Robert Malcolm Graham (July 26, 1897 – January 20, 1981) was a member of the Wisconsin State Assembly.

Biography
Graham was born on July 26, 1897 in Brandon, Wisconsin. He attended high school in Warren, St. Croix County, Wisconsin. He died on January 20, 1981, in Phoenix, Arizona.

Career
Graham was elected to the Assembly in 1926. He was a Republican.

References

People from Brandon, Wisconsin
People from St. Croix County, Wisconsin
Republican Party members of the Wisconsin State Assembly
American Congregationalists
1897 births
1981 deaths
20th-century American politicians